Glavatskikh is a Russian gender-neutral surname originating from глава meaning head, leader. It may refer to
Konstantin Glavatskikh (born 1985), Russian cross-country skier 
Roman Glavatskikh (born 1983), Russian futsal player 

Russian-language surnames